Xyloskenea translucens is a species of sea snail, a marine gastropod mollusk in the family Turbinidae, the turban snails.

References

 all W. H. (1927). Small shells from dredgings off the southeast coast of the United states by the United States Fisheries Steamer "Albatross", in 1885 and 1886. Proceedings of the United States National Museum, 70(18): 1-134

External links
 To World Register of Marine Species

translucens
Gastropods described in 1927